Mukhra is a 1988 Pakistani Punjabi film starring Nadeem Baig and Babra Sharif. The film was a hit at the box-office.

Plot

Powla (Nadeem Baig) is a village bumpkin who dreams of being brave by defeating robbers. In reality, he is a coward.

His mother (Nighat Butt) dies suddenly due to a snake bite. Powla wishes to die too so that he may reunite with his mother in death. He tries to commit suicide by laying down on a railroad track but his plan is foiled when some men find him there and take him to their boss. The men are gangsters and seeing Powla's naivety they want to take advantage of him. They plan to use his death as a way to commit insurance fraud. Soniya (Babra Sharif) is the gangsters' secretary.

Powla keeps trying to find a way to kill himself. One day, a lady is injured by a car of some gangsters. Powla sees her and takes her to a hospital. Her daughter (Sameena Peerzada) comes to the hospital and she recovers. Being grateful to Powla, she starts to consider him as her son and her daughter also thinks of him as a brother.

Meanwhile, the gangsters are still trying to kill him and commit insurance fraud. Soniya overhears their plan to kill him and decides to save him. She saves his life twice, but never reveals her true identity to him. The villagers mistakenly start to believe that it is Powla who is fending off his attackers and start considering him to be a brave man.

Powla eventually discovers Soniya's identity. His sister's marriage is due to be held, but the gangsters come again once and for all to completely destroy Powla. They wound his adoptive mother & abduct his sister. She kills herself when they attempt to rape her. Finally, Powla is no longer afraid. He teams up with Soniya and takes revenge against the villains.

Cast
Adeeb as Adeeb
Nadeem Baig as Powla
Babra Sharif as Soniya
Samina Peerzada as Powla's sister
Nighat Butt as Powla's mother
Talish
Ismail Shah
Afzaal Ahmad
Humayun Qureshi

Soundtrack
The music of the movie was composed by Wajahat Attre. The songs were sung by Madam Noor Jehan, Humaira Channa, Masood Rana and Nadeem.

Bindi da lashkara meri Bindi da lashkara, Sung by Noor Jehan
Mundia, Dopatta chhad mera, nahin sharman da ghund lai da... Sung by Noor Jehan, Nadeem, lyrics by Khawaja Pervez
Teinu takia pharak gayi Akh ni, tere qadman che Dil ditta rakh ni, dhak dhina dhin Dil gaya Sung by Noor Jehan, Nadeem and Masood Rana
Ik mera Mukhra piara, pagal zamana sara... Sung by Humaira Channa
 Vekh Ve Din Charya Ke Nayi sung by Noor Jehan
 Cheechi Wich Challa Mere Ranjhan Da Sung by Noor Jehan

Reception 
Mukhra was successful at the box-office.

References

1988 films
Punjabi-language Pakistani films
1980s Punjabi-language films